Nielsen & Winther was a Danish machine factory and aeroplane manufacturer based in Copenhagen, Denmark.

History
The machine factory was founded in 1873. It was from 1899 to 1916 based in a building at Blegdamsvej 60 designed by Axel Berg. It then relocated to a new building designed by Frederik Wagner at Ryesgade 51-55 as well as a large new plant at Øresundsvej 147.

Aircraft production
The Amager plant was home to a new aeroplane division. It delivered six Nielsen & Winther Type Aa aeroplanes to the Royal Danish Air Force in 1917. One aircraft was delivered to the Royal Norwegian Navy Air Service in 1918. Three of the six Danish aircraft crashed in accidents and the three remaining ones were therefore grounded. The Amager plant was sold to Vølund in 1920.

Aircraft produced by Nielsen & Winther:-
Data from A/S Nielsen & Winther
Aa - c/n N&W.1 1-seat fighter with  Thulin A engine, delivered 15 January 1917, withdrawn from use 31 March 1919.
Aa - c/n N&W.2 crashed 17 December 1917.
Aa - c/n N&W.3 crashed 19 Mar 1919.
Aa - c/n N&W.4 converted to ground trainer 31 March 1919, scrapped 1924.
Aa - c/n N&W.5 converted to ground trainer on 31 March 1919, scrapped 1924.
Aa - c/n N&W.6 crashed 17 October 1918.
Ab - c/n N&W.70 sold to A.Jarfeldt, a Danish/Argentinian pilot, exported to Argentina/Bolivia.
Ab - c/n N&W.71 completed but not delivered.
Ac 2-seat float-plane version of Aa (prototype) crashed at Øresund.
Bd 2-seat float plane  Scania-Vabis PD engine ; exported to the Royal Norwegian Navy Air Service.
C Two Bi-plane ground rolling trainers used by the Nielsen & Winther flying School.
D 4-seater “Tourist-biplane”  Nielsen & Winther M.A.J. engine; probably never flown.
E planned Cargo aircraft  Nielsen & Winther M.A.J. engine ; not built.
Fa Sports flying-boat ; sold to C.Hundinghouse Jensen.
Fa - c/n N&W.21Sports flying-boat exported to Norway, registered as N1 to Einar Juell.

Football club
Nielsen & Winther was also the name of a football club founded in 1918 by workers at the factory:

Legacy
The company's former buildings at Blegdamsvej 60 and Ryesgade 51-55 have survived. The Amager plant, taken over by Vølund, was demolished in 2001. Its premises in the Free Port was taken over by Riffelsyndikatet.

References 

Manufacturing companies of Denmark
Manufacturing companies based in Copenhagen
Danish companies established in 1873
Manufacturing companies established in 1983
Aerospace companies